The 2017–18 Temple Owls women's basketball team will represent Temple University during the 2017–18 NCAA Division I women's basketball season. The season marks the fifth for the Owls as members of the American Athletic Conference. The Owls, led by tenth year head coach Tonya Cardoza, play their home games at McGonigle Hall and the Liacouras Center. They finished the season 12–19, 3–13 in AAC play to finish a tie for last place. They advanced to the quarterfinals of the American Athletic Conference women's tournament where they lost to UCF.

Media
All Owls home games will have video streaming on Owls TV, ESPN3, or AAC Digital. Road games will typically be streamed on the opponents website, though conference road games could also appear on ESPN3 or AAC Digital. There are no radio broadcasts for Owls women's basketball games.

Roster

Schedule and results

|-
! colspan="12" style="background:#9e1b34; color:#fff;"| Exhibition

|-
! colspan="12" style="background:#9e1b34; color:#fff;"| Regular season

|-
! colspan="12" style="background:#9e1b34; color:#fff;"| AAC Women's Tournament

Rankings

See also
 2017–18 Temple Owls men's basketball team

References

Temple Owls women's basketball seasons
Temple
Temple
Temple